Sutton Camera was a priory in Herefordshire, England at .

References

Monasteries in Herefordshire